The Neve Shalom Synagogue massacre happened on 6 September 1986 when a group of suspected Abu Nidal Organization terrorists killed 22 worshipers inside the Neve Shalom Synagogue in Istanbul, Turkey.

Attack 
The pair of gunmen stormed the synagogue around 9:17 in the morning of 6 September 1986, when the worshippers were reciting the Shabbat parasha. The terrorists entered on the men's side of the mechitza where they opened fire on the crowd with machine guns and then doused the bodies of the dead and injured with gasoline, which they lit on fire. Witnesses said they heard the gunmen speaking Arabic among themselves.

The attackers took out "extremely powerful" grenades and blew themselves apart, killing themselves and disfiguring their bodies so hard that investigators were unable to identify who they were.  The grenades set off a fire in the building that lasted several hours.

By the end of the massacre, 22 people had been killed. The victims ranged in age from 30 to 82.  Three of the people killed were Persian Jews, including an Iranian-born rabbi. Around two dozen were wounded, including four women hit by splinters in the women's gallery.

Aftermath 
Two previously unknown Lebanese groups both separately claimed responsibility for the massacre, but the authenticity of the claims have been doubted. The Palestinian Abu Nidal Organization, although it never claimed responsibility, was widely suspected of perpetrating the attack. Turkish police suspected the shooting was done by Abu Nidal but with the assistance of other groups, which it believed were likely Iran, Libya and Syria.

All the victims were buried in the Ulus Ashkenazi Jewish Cemetery.

Reactions 
The Neve Shalom massacre was widely condemned in Turkey and internationally. The Cabinet of Turkey arranged a special session shortly after on Prime Minister Turgut Özal's orders, who described the incident as "heinous" and "odious assault." Jewish synagogues and institutions were provided heavy security in fear of another attack. President of the United States Ronald Reagan wrote a letter to the Jewish community of Istanbul sharply condemning the massacre.

Israeli Prime Minister Shimon Peres denounced the attack as "beastly" and vowed "not [to] rest until we cut off this murderous hand." Simon Wiesenthal Center associate dean Abraham Cooper said the massacre was a "resurrect[ion of] the imagery and savagery of the Holocaust."

See also 

 Great Synagogue of Rome attack
 List of attacks attributed to Abu Nidal
 Terror attacks in Istanbul

References 

1986 in Judaism
1986 in Turkey
1986 mass shootings in Europe 
Abu Nidal attacks
Antisemitism in Turkey
Massacres in 1986
Massacres in religious buildings and structures
Massacres in Turkey
Massacres of men
September 1986 crimes
September 1986 events in Europe
20th-century attacks on synagogues and Jewish communal organizations
Terrorist incidents in Turkey in 1986
Palestinian terrorist incidents in Europe
20th-century mass murder in Turkey
Mass murder in Istanbul
1986 suicides
Deaths by firearm in Turkey
Murder–suicides in Turkey
Suicides by explosive device
Arson in Turkey
1986 murders in Turkey
Violence against men in Europe
Terrorist incidents in Istanbul
Beyoğlu